Nozima Kamoltoeva (born 19 September 1998) is an Uzbekistani footballer who plays as a defender for the Women's Championship club Metallurg. She is also a futsal player, and represented Uzbekistan internationally in both football and futsal.

Club career
Kamoltoeva has played for Metallurg in Uzbekistan.

International career
Kamoltoeva has been capped for Uzbekistan at senior level in both football and futsal. In football, she represented Uzbekistan at two AFC U-19 Women's Championship qualifications (2015 and 2017) and the 2018 AFC Women's Asian Cup qualification.

In futsal, Kamoltoeva played for Uzbekistan at the 2018 AFC Women's Futsal Championship.

References

1998 births
Living people
People from Tashkent Region
Uzbekistani women's footballers
Women's association football defenders
Uzbekistan women's international footballers
Uzbekistani women's futsal players
21st-century Uzbekistani women